Worsthorne is a rural village on the eastern outskirts of Burnley in Lancashire, England.  It is in the civil parish of Worsthorne-with-Hurstwood and the borough of Burnley. At the 2011 census the village had a population of 1,028.

The village was known as Worthesthorn in 1202, which means "thorn tree of a man named 'Weorth'."

The village has a small village green, overlooked by the church and Bay Horse public house. Buildings in the village include cottages dating from the 16th and 17th centuries, and housing for millworkers dating from the Industrial Revolution. Relatively high property prices in the village reflect the fact that it is perceived to be a desirable place to live, with low crime and good education.

History

The history of human habitation in the area goes back to the late stone, bronze and Iron Ages.
A flint dagger 15 cm in length found on the moor is now in Towneley Museum.

Governance
Worsthorne forms part of the Worsthorne with Cliviger ward, which is currently represented on Burnley Borough Council by two Green Party councillors. In 2002 the ward elected a British National Party (BNP) councillor, which generated considerable media comment at the time; the seat returned to the Conservative Party when it was next contested. In the 2021 local elections, the ward returned a Green Party councillor for the first time. In 2022 The Green Party won a 2nd seat to become the majority party in the ward for the first time.

Landmarks
 The village had a close association with the Thursby family, benefactors of the Burnley area, and has a number of listed buildings. These include Jackson's House in the centre of the village, which was built in about 1600, and the Church of St. John the Evangelist which dates from 1833–1839. The original plans for the church, drawn up by architect Lewis Vulliamy, can be seen on the Incorporated Church Building Society website. It has a 61 ft clocktower, stained glass windows and wrought ironwork. The churchyard has the grave of a packmaster, a person whose job was to lead packhorses across the moors in special sunken trails that allowed the horses to walk unhitched since the walls of the trail prevented them from straying.

An earlier landmark used to be Worsthorne Methodist Chapel, on Chapel Street off Ormerod Street, next to where the former Old Hall stood, but it was demolished in the 1980s, an old people's home now sits on this site. The connected Sunday School building is now a children's nursery.

There is a former cotton mill in Gordon Street, a relic of the time when the area, especially Burnley, was the world centre of cotton weaving.

There are two public houses in the village: the Crooked Billet and the Bay Horse Inn.

Education
The village has a primary school with about 180 pupils in the 4–11 age range, serving Worsthorne, Hurstwood, Brownside and Pike Hill. The school houses seven classes in modern buildings and has extensive playing fields and grounds. Students used to be organised into four houses, Gorple, Extwistle, Brownside and Ormerod, which were named after the four roads running into Worsthorne and which meet in the village square. However, in 2020 the houses were renamed to Earth, Wind, Fire and Water. The original village school house, now converted into residential housing, stands in the square.

Transport
A regular bus service (route 4) runs between Worsthorne, Burnley and Stoops.  On Mondays to Fridays, the first bus leaves the village square at 06:53 and services then run hourly until 18:53

Notable people
 Ron Greenwood CBE (1921–2006), the English football player and manager, was born in Worsthorne.
 Footballer Brian Miller lived there for many years before passing away in 2007. Miller played and managed Burnley F.C. throughout his career at the football club.
 Catriona Seth, Marshal Foch Professor of French Literature at the University of Oxford, was born here
 Thomas Whitham VC, soldier, First World War was born here.

See also
Listed buildings in Worsthorne-with-Hurstwood

References

External links

Worsthorne-with-Hurstwood Township – British History Online

 
Villages in Lancashire
Districts in Burnley